Rachel Eckroth is a Grammy nominated American singer-songwriter and keyboardist from Phoenix, Arizona. She is currently the keyboardist for alternative musician St. Vincent and singer-songwriter Rufus Wainwright after being the keyboardist for jazz trumpeter Chris Botti, singer-songwriter KT Tunstall, and The Meredith Vieira Show. Her latest album The Garden was released by Rainy Days Records in 2021.

Biography
Rachel Eckroth was born into a musical family in Mandan, North Dakota and raised in Phoenix, Arizona. As a high school student, she was already performing in the Phoenix jazz scene and had the mentorship of former Count Basie vocalist Dennis Rowland. She then went to study at the University of Nevada, Las Vegas receiving her BA in Jazz Performance. In 2001, Eckroth moved to New York City and studied under jazz pianist Stanley Cowell at Rutgers University before receiving her MFA in Jazz Piano. In 2005 Eckroth released her debut album Mind with bassist Kevin Thomas and drummer Chris Benham. Later, Eckroth joined saxophonist Arun Luthra to release the album Louder Than Words in 2009.

In 2014, Eckroth released her album Let Go, which began her pursuit of singer-songwriter music. Later that year, she also released Makeover Volume 1, an EP featuring pop covers of her musical influences.

Eckroth was also the keyboardist for The Meredith Vieira Show house band from 2014 to 2016 before joining the backing band for singer-songwriter KT Tunstall in 2016. She then began her role as the keyboardist for Chris Botti in 2017.

In 2017 Eckroth also formed a fusion jazz group called Antelog, who released their self-titled debut album that same year. In addition, Eckroth served as the assistant music director for the 2017 Women's March in Washington DC.

Eckroth released her new album When It Falls in September 2018. The album features many guest musicians including bassist Tim Lefebvre (David Bowie, Tedeschi Trucks Band), guitarist Doyle Bramhall II (Eric Clapton, Roger Waters), Matt Chamberlain (Tori Amos, Pearl Jam) and guitarist Derek Trucks (Tedeschi Trucks Band and the Allman Brothers Band). In May 2018, she released her first single from the album titled "Dark Waters".

Eckroth is currently the keyboardist for singer-songwriter Rufus Wainwright and was also the supporting act for his All These Poses Anniversary Tour in 2018–2019. She released the single "I'll Try" with singer-songwriter Althea Grace in 2019, along with two singles "Dale Cooper" and "Laura Palmer" with Antelog. In 2020, she released the singles "Get U Ready", "Perfect Love" ft. Sy Smith, and "Gloomy Sunday". She was also featured on saxophonist Donny McCaslin's single "Circling" and on NPR's Jazz Night in America with bassist Tim Lefebvre.

Eckroth released the single "Moot Points" with singer Alassane and bassist Tim Lefebvre in 2021. Eckroth and Lefebvre also released an album of jazz standards titled The Blackbird Sessions Vol. 1. That same year, Eckroth released a self-titled EP that was produced by David Garza (Fiona Apple) at Sonic Ranch, and she released her Grammy nominated album The Garden on Rainy Days Records, which included saxophonist Donny McCaslin, bassist Tim Lefebvre, and guitarist Nir Felder. Eckroth recently joined the backing band for St. Vincent's Daddy's Home Tour.

Discography

As Leader/Co-Leader

Rachel Eckroth
 The Garden (2021)
 Rachel Eckroth (EP) (2021)
 Gloomy Sunday (Single) (2020)
 Perfect Love (Single) ft. Sy Smith (2020)
 Get U Ready (Single) (2020)
 When It Falls (2018)
 Makeover Volume 1 (2014)
 Let Go (2014)

Alassane, Rachel Eckroth, and Tim Lefebvre
 Moot Points (Single) (2021)

Rachel Eckroth and Tim Lefebvre
 The Blackbird Sessions Vol. 1 (2021)

Antelog
 Dale Cooper (Single) (2019)
 Laura Palmer (Single) (2019)
 Antelog (2017)

Althea Grace and Rachel Eckroth
 I'll Try (Single) (2019)

Michael Stegner and Rachel Eckroth
 Fell From You (Single) (2019)

Arun Luthra and Rachel Eckroth
 Louder Than Words (2009)

Rachel Eckroth Trio
 Mind (2005)

As a Session Artist
 Aimee Mann: Suicide Is Murder (Single) (2021)
 Zach Tabori: Pandemic Ballads (2020)
 Scott Newell: Psycho Electric (2020)
 Donny McCaslin: Circling (Single) (2020)
 Michael Stegner: A Believer (Single) (2019)
 Emily Saliers: Murmuration Nation (2017)
 Climbing Poetree: INTRINSIC (2017)
 KT Tunstall: KT Tunstall's Acoustic Extravaganza 2 (2017)
 KT Tunstall: Live at O2 Shepherds Bush Empire (2016)
 Jay White: Tomorrow (Single) (2017)
 Shirazette Tinnin: Humility: Purity of My Soul (2014)
 Jesse Fischer & Soul Cycle: Retro Future (2012)
 Marion Meadows: Secrets (2009)
 Pete Gitlin: Full Circle and the Great Temptation (2008)
 UNLV Jazz Ensemble: Coloring Outside the Lines (1999)

References

External links
 
 
 

Year of birth missing (living people)
Living people
American women singer-songwriters
American jazz keyboardists
21st-century American keyboardists
Women keyboardists
21st-century American women singers
21st-century American singers
Singer-songwriters from Arizona